Rhonda Britten (born Rhonda Wiitanen, December 1, 1960 in Two Harbors, Minnesota) is the founder of the Fearless Living Institute, a public speaker, author and actress.

Early life
She was the middle child of three girls, and was the target of her divorced father's physical and emotional abuse.  At the age of 14, she was the only witness to her father shooting and killing her mother and then shooting himself, which was one of the primary reasons she does counseling and life coaching.

In her twenties, she appeared in Married...With Children episode Do Ya Think I'm Sexy (1990) as sexy Donna; and as a student in the 22 February 1991 TV episode of Perfect Strangers.

Career
In 2001, she started the Fearless Living Institute after trying to commit suicide three times and realizing that fear was at her problems' core.  In an interview with Terra Wellington about the basis of the Institute, Rhonda said "No one can be fearless alone.  But, you have to be willing to change your life."  That same year she was the "life doctor" on a British reality show called "Help Me, Rhonda," which ran until 2003.

She is perhaps best known as being the lead life coach on the reality TV series Starting Over from 2003-2006.  During her run on the show, she, along with her co-hosts, Iyanla Vanzant, Dr. Stan Katz, and the crew won a Daytime Emmy; a first for any reality show.

In 2010, she starred as the life coach on VH1's Celebrity Fit Club's Season 7.

Author
She is the author of four best-selling books: "Fearless Loving" (2004), "Change Your Life in 30 Days" (2005), "Do I Look Fat In This?: Get Over Your Body and On With Your Life" (2007), "Fearless Living: Live Without Excuses and Love Without Regret" (2011).

References

External links 

 

American motivational speakers
Women motivational speakers
1960 births
Living people
American self-help writers
People from Two Harbors, Minnesota